The 2018 Cure Bowl was a college football bowl game played on December 15, 2018, with kickoff scheduled for 1:30 p.m. EST. It was the fourth edition of the Cure Bowl, and one of the 2018–19 bowl games concluding the 2018 FBS football season. Sponsored by automotive retailer AutoNation, the game was officially known as the AutoNation Cure Bowl.

Teams
The game was played between the Tulane Green Wave from the American Athletic Conference (AAC) and the Louisiana Ragin’ Cajuns from the Sun Belt Conference. Both teams made their first appearance in a Cure Bowl. This game was the 27th all time meeting against the Ragin' Cajuns and the Green Wave, with Tulane leading the series 22–4; this was their second meeting in a bowl.

Louisiana

Louisiana won the Sun Belt West Division title, earning a berth in the inaugural Sun Belt Championship, where they lost to Appalachian State. The Ragin' Cajuns entered the bowl with a 7–6 record (5–3 in conference).

Tulane

Tulane received and accepted a bid to the Cure Bowl on December 2. The Green Wave, who were co-champions of the West Division of the AAC, entered the bowl with a 6–6 record (5–3 in conference).

Game summary

Scoring summary

Statistics

References

External links

Box score at ESPN

Cure Bowl
Cure Bowl
Cure Bowl
Cure Bowl
Louisiana Ragin' Cajuns football bowl games
Tulane Green Wave football bowl games